Tigveni is a commune in Argeș County, Muntenia, Romania. It is composed of eight villages: Bădislava, Bălilești, Bălteni, Bârseștii de Jos, Bârseștii de Sus, Blaju, Tigveni, and Vlădești.

The commune is located in the northwestern part of the county, on the border with Vâlcea County. It is crossed by national road , which connects Câmpulung, Curtea de Argeș, and Râmnicu Vâlcea.

Natives
 Gabriel Marinescu (1886–1940), general
 Nicolae Marinescu (1884–1963), doctor, general, politician

References

Communes in Argeș County
Localities in Muntenia